Marguerite Anne Maddern (born 28 October 1955) is an Australian Liberal National politician who was the member of the Legislative Assembly of Queensland for Maryborough from 2012 to 2015, having defeated Chris Foley at the 2012 state election.

In 2016, Maddern was elected to the Fraser Coast Regional Council as the councillor for Division 2.

References

Liberal National Party of Queensland politicians
1955 births
Living people
Members of the Queensland Legislative Assembly
21st-century Australian politicians
21st-century Australian women politicians
Women members of the Queensland Legislative Assembly